A fad is a practice or interest followed for a time with exaggerated zeal.

Fad or FAD may also refer to:

 Familial Alzheimer disease, an uncommon form of Alzheimer's disease
 Flavin adenine dinucleotide is a redox cofactor chemical compound.
 Fad Browne (1906–1991), Irish politician
 Fad diet
 First appearance datum, the date of the oldest known fossil of a living species
 Fish aggregating device, for fishing
 Flying Ant Day, a period of increased perception of the nuptial flight for ants prompted by changes in weather.
 Wagi language of Papua New Guinea, ISO 639-3 code
 Food availability decline; see Theories of famines
 Fusil Automático Doble, a rifle used by the Peruvian Army.

See also 
 
 FADD
 Fads (disambiguation)